Mramor is a village in the municipality of Tuzla, Tuzla Canton, Bosnia and Herzegovina. It is located between Tuzla and Srebrenik.

It was the location of the 1990 Dobrnja-Jug mine disaster, where 180 miners died.

Demographics 
According to the 2013 census, its population was 188.

Notable people
Selma Bajrami (born 1980), pop-folk singer
Zoran Tomić (1958–1989), footballer

References

Populated places in Tuzla